Binet is surname of French origin, shared by the following people:

Alfred Binet, a 19th-century French psychologist and inventor of the first usable intelligence test.
The Stanford-Binet IQ test is partially named after Alfred Binet.
Charles Henri Joseph Binet (1869–1936), Catholic archbishop and Cardinal from France.
Charles Binet-Sanglé (1868–1941), a French military doctor and psychologist.
Etienne Binet, a 17th-century French Jesuit author.
Jacques Philippe Marie Binet, an 18th-century French mathematician.
Binet's formula for the Fibonacci sequence is named after Jacques Binet.
The Cauchy-Binet formula of linear algebra is partially named after Jacques Binet.
Jean-Auguste-Gustave Binet (pen name Binet-Valmer), a Franco-Swiss writer
Jocelyne Binet, a Canadian pianist, composer and music teacher.
Laurent Binet (born 1972), a French writer and university lecturer

See also
BiNet USA (Bisexual Network of the USA)
Banet, another surname